James Stewart Jr. (born December 21, 1985), also known as Bubba Stewart, is an American former professional motocross racer who competed in the AMA Motocross and the AMA Supercross Championships. Through his years of racing, he earned the nickname "The Fastest Man on The Planet".

Stewart is second in all time 450 Supercross wins (50), and second all time in AMA outdoor national wins (48). He also developed the "Bubba Scrub" or just "scrub", which became a fundamental skill needed to compete in motocross.

He was the first to host his own television show, Bubba's World. He brought in endorsement deals paying him over $10M a year throughout his career. He has the record for best rookie season, having won 10/12 Motocross races in 2002.

Stewart won the Motocross of Nations twice and the World Supercross title three times. Additionally, he won four AMA Supercross Champion titles and three AMA Motocross Champion titles. He won the Red Bull Straight Rhythm in both 2014 and 2015.

Career

Amateur and Lites Class
Stewart was born in Bartow, Florida, and currently resides in Haines City, Florida. His father, James Sr., was a motocross enthusiast and introduced his son to the sport at the age of three. Stewart entered his first motocross race when he was four years old.

Having 84 amateur wins and 7 Loretta Lynn's Amateur Championships all before the age of 16, he debuted as pro in 2002. While crashes and rookie mistakes prevented him from winning the 2002 125 West Supercross title, he did finish second overall. 

He went on to dominate the 2002 Motocross Championship, and was named the 2002 AMA Rookie of the Year.   He was also named one of "20 Teens Who Will Change the World" in the April 2003 issue of Teen People magazine .

Stewart went on to win the 2003 125 West Supercross Championship and the 125 East/West Shootout in Las Vegas, Nevada.

In 2004 he won both the 125 East Supercross title and the 125 Outdoor national title, only losing one moto to Mike Brown in the latter due to a broken clutch cover.

One of two riders in history to have won every moto/race in season
Ranked #2 all time SX wins (50).  Ranked #3 all time pro AMA wins (98).  X games medal for best whip.  2002 AMA 125 Motocross national champion.  2003 AMA 125 West Supercross Champion.       2004 AMA 125 East Supercross Champion.  2004 AMA 125 Motocross National Champion.              2006 FIM World Supercross Grand Prix Champion.  2006 Motocross of Nations Champion.             2007 AMA Supercross Champion.  2007 FIM World Supercross Grand Prix Champion.  2008 AMA Motocross National Champion.  2008 Motocross of Nations Champion.  2009 AMA Supercross Champion.         2009 FIM World Supercross Champion.  2014 Redbull Straight Rhythm Champion.  2015 Redbull Straight Rhythm Champion

Supercross

On April 2, 2005, at Texas Stadium (in his 3rd Supercross race), Stewart captured his first Supercross victory.  He would go on to record many more victories throughout 2005 and 2006, and he eventually won the 2007 Supercross Championship.  He was unable to finish the 2007 National series due to a knee injury.

2008
Stewart missed the last 15 races of the 2008 Supercross season due to a knee injury caused by a crash into Dale White #7.

2009
Stewart signed with L&M Yamaha racing for the 2009 season, replacing Chad Reed for the supercross season. Stewart won 11 of the 17 events.  On May 2, 2009, at Sam Boyd Stadium in Las Vegas, Stewart won the 2009 Supercross Championship by a margin of 4 points over Reed (377-373).

2010
After a strong charge by Supercross class rookie Ryan Dungey at the opening round at Anaheim, Stewart captured the lead on lap 18, going on to take the win. In round 2, Stewart was involved in a crash during his heat, but came back to win the Last Chance Qualifier. In the final, a collision with Chad Reed caused both riders to fall. Reed's left hand was pinned under Stewart and Reed pushed Stewart's head off his arm, in what some deemed to be a physically aggressive manner. Controversy followed in the pits when Stewart pushed Reed's bike off its stand, resulting in an official warning from the AMA. Still struggling with injury Stewart finished 3rd behind Ryan Dungey and Josh Hill in round 3. Stewart retired from the season after having surgery from Dr. Arthur Ting for a broken right scaphoid.

Stewart's wrist injury took longer than expected to heal, leaving him out of the 2010 Motocross series, although he did return for one round at Unadilla where he placed third in the first moto and retired early from the second moto, citing bike setup issues and exhaustion.

2011
On January 8, 2011, Stewart made his return to Supercross placing 3rd in the Anaheim season opener. The next week at Phoenix on January 15, he won his first main event in over a year, leading all 20 laps over Ryan Villopoto, who trailed close behind for most of the race. Throughout the season Stewart suffered several crashes with his last big crash in the season finale at Las Vegas where he had the lead but then crashed in the whoops. He took out Kevin Windham along with him, allowing Villopoto and Reed to pass.

2012
On March 10, 2012, Stewart claimed his 44th Supercross win by taking 1st place at Daytona International Speedway. At the end of the season, Stewart left Joe Gibbs Motocross Racing.

2013
On January 5, 2013, after an unsuccessful finish of the 2012 AMA Motocross Series, Stewart made his return to Supercross with his new Yoshimura Suzuki bike. Despite having a sore right knee, he finished 8th in the Main Event at the Anaheim season opener. He got back up in Atlanta winning the main event, leading all 20 laps. Throughout the season, Stewart had several crashes, including at the Metrodome, in Minneapolis, where he had the lead in the Heat Race, but crashed in the rhythm section near the Mechanics Area. He did come back with a win in the LCQ. In the Main Event, Stewart was injured again, this time tweaking his wrist, and retired on Lap 7. Consequently, Stewart was out for the remainder of the three rounds of the 2013 AMA Supercross Series.

On October 19, 2013, Stewart raced the Monster Energy Cup for the first time at Sam Boyd Stadium in Las Vegas. Having a bad start in the first heat, he fought up to 8th. In the second heat he took the holeshot and was battling with Villopoto, beating Villopoto due to a hard crash on the Last Lap after missing the Joker Lane. In the third heat, James fought hard past Ken Roczen and took the 3rd moto win. On the Final Lap, Stewart took the Joker Lane twice on second and third Motos, before crossing the finish line. He won the overall and the $100,000 payout

2014
Coming off an overall win in the Monster Energy Cup, Stewart was a title threat for the 2014 Supercross Championship. On January 4, 2014, at Angel Stadium at A1 Stewart started mid pack and worked his way up to leader Ken Roczen. With five laps to go, he had a big crash in the whoops and finished seventeenth. In San Diego on February 8, he won his first main event for 2014 and went on to win five more main events, including a win in Toronto to pass Ricky Carmichael for second in all-time wins in Supercross. Stewart made the podium eight times and finished the season in 3rd place.

2015
Stewart was suspended for 16 months for failing an anti-doping test.  Stewart, who is medically prescribed Adderall, failed to submit the proper paperwork for a Therapeutic Use Exemption (TUE). Stewart missed the entire 2015 Supercross season and the 2015 Lucas Oil Pro Motocross Championship series.

Following his suspension, Stewart returned to race the single-day Monster Energy Cup in Las Vegas, Nevada. After a crash in the first of three rounds, Stewart did not start the following motos.

2016
Stewart returned for Anaheim 1 at the start of the 2016 Supercross season. However, in the main event a first lap mishap by Ryan Dungey caused Stewart to crash. Stewart was knocked unconscious and suffered a concussion. Stewart did not return to racing after this injury, and an official retirement would later be announced.

2019

On May 17, 2019, Stewart announced his retirement. "Where I'm at in my life, I think it's time to say I'm retiring. I've retired," he said in part. "It's hard for sure, because I love racing and I love the fans, I love the opening ceremonies, I love the autograph lines, but I don't miss the sweat and tears and training and having to feel like you have to win every race and having to be James Stewart. I don't love doing that anymore."

Motocross class

2005
AMA 250 class 10th overall

2006
AMA 4th overall

2007
AMA 7th overall

2008
Having missed the entire Supercross season, he returned to racing at the first round of the outdoor nationals and went on to win all 24 motos and thus the championship.

2009
Stewart did not compete in the 2009 Motocross series.

2010
A wrist injury sustained in the Supercross season prevented Stewart from competing in the 2010 Motocross series, although he did return for one round at Unadilla, where he placed second in the first moto and retired early from the second moto, citing bike setup issues and exhaustion.

2011
Stewart chose not to race the 2011 National season citing lack of preparation.

2012
One day after announcing his split from JGRMX and Yamaha, Stewart signed to ride with Yoshimura Suzuki aboard their RMZ-450. Stewart won the first four motos of the season. However, during Round 3 of Thunder Valley in Colorado, Stewart was leading when he crashed. The result of the crash was a serious injury is his right hand breaking his wrist. Consequently, he was unable to finish the rest of the Motocross series due to the extent of the injury. Though he did come back at some point in Red Bud, but due to multiple injuries, Stewart will not race for the rest of the 2012 AMA Motocross Series until he gets 100% healthy.

Chad Reed was thought to be the main show for the title, even though he struggled to ride hard and pass for the lead. Throughout the season, James Stewart making him 5th place overall. Stewart struggled to ride hard due to a neck injury.

Total career AMA wins
28 wins in 125/250 AMA Motocross 10-2002 7-2003 11-2004
50 wins in 450 AMA Supercross 3-2005 8-2006 13-2007 1-2008 11-2009 1-2010 5-2011 2-2012 1-2013 5-2014
20 wins in 250/450 AMA Motocross 3-2006 1-2007 12-2008 2-2012 1-2013 1-2014
98 total AMA wins 10-2002 7-2003 11-2004 3-2005 11-2006 14-2007 13-2008 11-2009 1-2010 5-2011 4-2012 2-2013 5-2014

X Games
Stewart made his X Games debut on July 30, 2009 at X Games XV, and placed second in the best whip competition with 21% of the votes winning his first X Games medal.

He suffered a deep bruise to his bone and muscle in his left shoulder during seeding trials for SuperMoto on July 31, forcing him to drop out of the games.

Reality TV show

On March 28, 2010, Stewart's reality show Bubba's World debuted and ran 10 episodes. The second season started in December, offered 13 episodes and concluded Feb. 24. There has been no announcement about a third season.

Gibbs and NASCAR

In October 2011, Stewart signed to race for Joe Gibbs Racing, with a multiyear contract to run for JGRMX in motocross as well as plans to run NASCAR stock car races in the K&N Pro Series East and Nationwide Series. At the end of the 2012 Supercross Season, Stewart left Joe Gibbs Racing and JGRMX. Stewart said that he would be open to racing with Gibbs in the future, but stated that he wanted to get back to being competitive in motorcycle racing, and that a change was necessary.

References

External links

 Dirt Rider Magazine: "James Stewart and Kyle Chisolm racing Team San Manuel L&M Racing Yamahas"
FUEL TV Series

Living people
1985 births
Sportspeople from Bartow, Florida
Racing drivers from Florida
American motocross riders
AMA Motocross Championship National Champions
NASCAR drivers
African-American racing drivers
Doping cases in motorcycle racing
American sportspeople in doping cases
21st-century African-American sportspeople
20th-century African-American people